Junk: The Golden Age of Debt is a 2016 play by Ayad Akhtar. It premiered at the La Jolla Playhouse in July 2016 and then on Broadway in 2017 and centers on a corporate takeover.

Background 
Described as a mix between a Shakespearean play and The Big Short, the play examines the point in American history when debt overtook value as the main route toward obtaining wealth. Although the characters are fictionalized, they are based upon real-life financial figures from the 1980s such as Michael Milken and others.

Production history
Junk received a reading at the Vassar College Powerhouse Theater on June 26, 2015, directed by Doug Hughes.

The play premiered at the La Jolla Playhouse (California) from July 26 to August 21, 2016, directed by Doug Hughes. 

The production opened on Broadway at the Vivian Beaumont Theater on October 5, 2017 in previews, and officially opened on November 2, 2017. The play closed on January 7, 2018 after 77 performances. The play was nominated for the 2018 Outer Critics Circle Award for Outstanding New Broadway Play. The play was nominated for the 2018 Tony Award for Best Play and Tony Award for Best Lighting Design in a Play.

Characters and original cast

Synopsis
Per the production’s official press release: “It's 1985. Robert Merkin, the resident genius of the upstart investment firm Sacker Lowell has just landed on the cover of Time Magazine. Hailed as "America's Alchemist," his proclamation that "debt is an asset" has propelled him to dizzying heights. Zealously promoting his belief in the near-sacred infallibility of markets, he is trying to re-shape the world.

JUNK is the story of Merkin's assault on American capitalism's holy of holies, the "deal of the decade," his attempt to takeover an iconic American manufacturing company and, in the process, to change all the rules. What Merkin sets in motion is nothing less than a financial civil war, pitting magnates against workers, lawyers against journalists, and ultimately, pitting every one against themselves.”

References

External links
Internet Broadway database

2016 plays